Koninklijke Voetbal Klub Tienen-Hageland is a Belgian association football club from the city of Tienen, Flemish Brabant.  It is currently playing in the Belgian Third Division.

History 

The club was founded in 1921 as R.C. Tirlemont (Tirlemont is the French for Tienen) and it became a member of the Belgian Football Association in 1922 with matricule number 132. It reached the second division in 1931 and it won its league in 1937 to access to the first division. However it remained only one season at the top level as the club finished 14th and last of the division.

In 1951 the club was renamed as R.R.C. Tirlemont. Between 1957 and 1967 Tirlemont spent 10 seasons at lower levels and played one more season in the second division in 1967–68 finishing last. In 1973 there was a new name change to R.R.C. Tienen.

Eight years later Matricule 132 merged with the Voorwaarts Tienen to become K.V.K. Tienen. The KVK accessed to the second division in 1999. In spite of a 17th place (on 18) in 2002 the club remained in the second division for two more seasons as K.R.C. Zuid-West-Vlaanderen was refused its license.  In 2004 the 17th place at which Tienen finished the championship caused it to be relegated to the third division.

In 2006, KVK Tienen promoted back to the Belgian second division but was relegated six years later. Nicky Hayen is currently coach for team. In 2013 the club declared bankruptcy and had to be refounded. In doing so they changed their name to KVK Tienen-Hageland, nevertheless they were demoted by the Belgian FA to the fourth division where it won its group to earn promotion back to the third tier after a season away.

Current squad

References

External links 
 Official website
 Belgian football clubs history
 RSSSF Archive – 1st and 2nd division final tables

 
Association football clubs established in 1921
Tienen
1921 establishments in Belgium
Tienen
Belgian Pro League clubs